is a passenger railway station located in the city of Sagamihara, Kanagawa Prefecture, Japan, operated by the East Japan Railway Company (JR East).

Lines

Station layout
The station consists of a single island platform connected to the station building by a footbridge. The station is unattended.

Platforms

History
With the opening of the nearby Imperial Japanese Army Academy (Rikugun Shikan Gakkō, or Rikushi), the station was renamed  on September 28, 1938. However, amid the counter-intelligence movement of eliminating the names of military facilities from maps, the station was soon renamed to its present name in 1940. On June 1, 1944, the Sagami Railway was nationalized and merged with the Japanese Government Railways. Freight services were discontinued from October 1962. On April 1, 1987, with the dissolution and privatization of the Japanese National Railways, the station came under the operation of JR East. Automated turnstiles using the Suica IC card system came into operation from November 2001. A station master's office was added in 2004.

Passenger statistics
In fiscal 2014, the station was used by an average of 1,241 passengers daily (boarding passengers only).

Surrounding area
Camp Zama

See also
List of railway stations in Japan

References

External links

Station information page 

Railway stations in Kanagawa Prefecture
Railway stations in Japan opened in 1931
Railway stations in Sagamihara
Sagami Line